The ViS Sprint is a  pusher configuration, pod-and-boom two-seat ultralight, designed and built in the Ukraine in the mid-2000s.  It can serve as an agricultural spraying aircraft.

Design and development

The Sprint is a high-wing monoplane with a constant-chord, straight-edged single-spar wing built, like most of the aircraft, from duralumin and braced with a single forward-leaning, streamlined strut on each side to the lower fuselage.  Flaps are fitted.  The fuselage is of the pod-and-boom type.  The pod is narrow, seating two in tandem under a three-piece transparency that extends, smoothly contoured, from just aft of the wing leading edge almost to the extreme nose.  The Sprint's fixed tricycle undercarriage is mounted on the fuselage, with spring cantilever main legs attached to the lower fuselage just below the wing bracing strut attachment points and a castoring nosewheel on a short extension placing it just in front of the nose. Its pusher configuration  Rotax 912 ULS water-cooled flat four engine is mounted on the upper rear of the pod at wing height, driving a three blade propeller just behind the trailing edge. The T tail unit is carried on the narrow rectangular section boom, an extension of the lower pod structure. Its fin is broad, swept and straight-edged, with a rear sloping hinge for the nearly rectangular rudder; the tailplane is braced from below to the boom.

The prototype VS-3 Sprint first flew in 2004 powered by a  Rotax 503 to cylinder horizontally opposed two stroke engine.  Later it was tested with a  Suzuki engine but the Rotax 912 was finally adopted.

Variants
Sprint Standard sport version
Sprint SKh Agricultural spraying version.  Carries 130 L (28.6 Imp gal; 34.3 US gal) of sprayant in two streamlined tanks attached to the lower fuselage just ahead of the wing  bracing strut and main undercarriage leg.  Liquid chemical is applied via underwing spraybars from the lower fuselage and supported below the wing on each side by a V-strut.

Specifications (Sprint)

References

Agricultural aircraft
2000s Ukrainian ultralight aircraft
High-wing aircraft
Single-engined pusher aircraft
Aircraft first flown in 2004